Ljubomir Obradović (born 16 September 1954) is a Serbian handball coach of the Cape Verde national team.

Managerial honours
Comercio e Industria (Setubal)
Portuguese Second Division: 1992–93
Belenenses
Portuguese First Division: 1993–94

Crvena zvezda
FR Yugoslavia First League: 1995–96
FR Yugoslavia Cup: 1994–95, 1995–96

Partizan
FR Yugoslavia Cup: 1997–98

Madeira SAD
Portuguese Cup: 1998–99

Vardar
Macedonian Super League: 2000–01
Macedonian Cup: 2000–01

Lovćen
Montenegro Cup: 2008–09

FC Porto
Portuguese First Division: 2009–10, 2010–11, 2011–12, 2012–13, 2013–14, 2014–15
Portuguese Super Cup: 2009–10, 2013–14
Limburgse Handbal Dagen: 2009, 2012

Yugoslavia (under–20)
European U20 Championship: 2000

References

Living people
1954 births
People from Odžaci
Serbian handball coaches
Liga ASOBAL players
Expatriate handball players
Serbian expatriate sportspeople in North Macedonia
Serbian expatriate sportspeople in Montenegro
Serbian expatriate sportspeople in Portugal
Serbian expatriate sportspeople in Spain
Handball coaches of international teams